Mitchell "Mitch" de Snoo (born October 22, 1992) is a  professional lacrosse player for the Toronto Rock of the National Lacrosse League and the Oakville Rock of Major Series Lacrosse. Hailing from Oshawa, Ontario, de Snoo attended Monsignor Paul Dwyer Catholic High School, where he played four years of lacrosse and ice hockey. He played collegiality at Drexel University, where he earned a degree in biomedical engineering. 

de Snoo played junior lacrosse for the Clarington Green Gaels and the Whitby Warriors, with whom he won the Minto Cup in 2013. He was in the third round (15th overall) in the 2014 MSL draft by the Oakville Rock.

de Snoo was drafted in the second round (13th overall) of the 2015 NLL Entry Draft by the Calgary Roughnecks, and was traded to the Buffalo Bandits on December 28, 2016 in exchange for Brandon Goodwin. On July 6, 2020, de Snoo was traded to the Toronto Rock in exchange for Brock Sorensen, Alex Tulett, & conditional 2022 draft pick.

de Snoo was named Defensive Player of the Year for the NLL's 2021-2022 season. Heading into the 2023 NLL season, Inside Lacrosse named de Snoo the #2 best defender in the NLL.

Off the floor, de Snoo earned a master's degree in laboratory medicine and pathobiology from the University of Toronto, having done research into genetic inheritable forms of Parkinson's. Currently, he is pursuing a medical degree at the University of Toronto.

He resides in Toronto with his wife, Meg de Snoo, and their dog.

NCAA Statistics

See also
Drexel Dragons men's lacrosse

References

External links
NLL stats at pointstreak.com
MSL stats at pointstreak.com

1992 births
Living people
Lacrosse people from Ontario
Sportspeople from Oshawa
Drexel Dragons men's lacrosse players
University of Toronto alumni
Buffalo Bandits players
Colorado Mammoth players